is a railway station operated by Kurobe Gorge Railway in Kurobe, Toyama Prefecture, Japan.

Station overview 

Kanetsuri Station is a staffed station and has two side platforms. The station serves Kanetsuri Onsen, which features a public outdoor onsen and a ryokan.

Adjacent stations

References

External links
  

Railway stations in Japan opened in 1953
Railway stations in Toyama Prefecture